The New Flyer High Floor was a line of conventional (high-floor) transit buses available in 35' rigid, 40' rigid, and 60' articulated lengths manufactured by New Flyer Industries between 1987 and 1996. The buses were powered by conventional diesel or natural gas engines using either V-drive or T-drive transmission couplings, with the exception of an articulated electric trolleybus variant manufactured for a single customer, the San Francisco Municipal Railway. The New Flyer Low Floor, a low-floor bus with a similar external appearance, was introduced in 1991 and proved to be more popular than the High Floor, which was discontinued in 1996 in diesel form. CNG high-floor buses continued to be built until 1999, and the articulated version was manufactured until early 2006.

Design 

For example, a New Flyer D40HF is a 40' (nominal) rigid high-floor bus with conventional diesel power. The "HF" suffix was added starting in the early 1990s to distinguish the earlier High Floor buses from the Low Floor buses, which were introduced in 1991. Prior to that time, the equivalent designation would simply be D40. The articulated D60/D60HF was nicknamed Galaxy.

The trolleybus was only made in a 60-foot articulated version (E60HF) for a single agency, Muni.

The New Flyer High Floor uses a tubular side construction clad with either aluminum or fiberglass panels; wheel housings are made of stainless steel, and stepwells have the option of either stainless steel or fiberglass. To reduce weight, the roof, front, and rear panels are made from fiberglass. All buses are equipped with rear-mounted engines using either V- or T-drive couplings to the transmission driving the rear axle; since the D60 articulated buses use the "pusher" configuration, the articulation joint is equipped with an anti-jackknifing feature.

Deployment 
The first New Flyer High Floor buses were model D40, delivered to the Toronto Transit Commission and Winnipeg Transit in 1987. AC Transit was the first customer for the D35 (1988, along with Santa Cruz METRO) and the D60 articulated model (1989). The first deliveries of natural gas-powered variants occurred in 1995: BC Transit, Los Angeles County Metropolitan Transportation Authority, and San Diego Metropolitan Transit System for the C40HF; Sun Metro (El Paso) for the L40HF.

The only E60 trolleybus variants built were a fleet of 60 sold to San Francisco Municipal Railway (Muni) in 1993, that agency's first use of articulated trolleybuses. The last of the E60s were retired in 2015. The last E60 (Muni #7031) was briefly put up for auction in 2019 before Muni withdrew the auction at the request of interested preservation groups.

Competition 
 Rapid Transit Series
 Classic (transit bus)
 Flxible Metro
 Gillig Phantom
 NABI 416
 Neoplan AN440
 Orion V

References

External links 
 
 
 
 
 
 

Buses of Canada
Buses of the United States
High Floor
Vehicles introduced in 1987
Articulated buses